Looney Tunes Super Stars' Pepé Le Pew: Zee Best of Zee Best is a DVD featuring all 17 Pepé Le Pew cartoons (14 new-to-DVD and three previously-on-DVD) and was released on December 27, 2011. The pre-53 shorts are presented in full screen while the post-53 shorts have both widescreen and full screen options (except for 1956's "Heaven Scent" which is only available in full screen). This was also the last Looney Tunes Super Stars series to feature a matted 1:85 widescreen format option for the post-1953 shorts and the only Warner Bros. home media release to feature the entire filmography of a major Looney Tunes character.

Contents 
 All cartoons on this disc feature Pepé Le Pew.

(*) Have been released on the Golden Collection DVD set

References 

Looney Tunes home video releases